The fifth and final season of Food Wars!: Shokugeki no Soma anime television series, subtitled , was produced by J.C.Staff and directed by Yoshitomo Yonetani. The series was first broadcast in Japan on Tokyo MX. It aired from April 11, 2020 to September 26, 2020. The opening theme is "Last Chapter" by Nano Ripe, while the ending theme song is "Crossing Road" by Mai Fuchigami. On April 17, 2020, it was announced that after the second episode, the remaining episodes of season would be delayed until further notice due to the effects of the COVID-19 pandemic. In late May 2020, it was announced that weekly new episodes would resume on July 18 after Japanese TV stations reran the first two episodes on July 4 and July 11.

In the United States, Adult Swim's Toonami programming block will begin airing the English dub on March 19, 2023.


Episode list

Home video releases

Japanese

English

Note

References

External links
  
 

Food Wars!: Shokugeki no Soma episode lists
2020 Japanese television seasons
Anime postponed due to the COVID-19 pandemic
Anime productions suspended due to the COVID-19 pandemic